Charles Robert Grey, 5th Earl Grey DL (15 December 1879 – 2 April 1963), styled Viscount Howick between 1894 and 1917, was an English nobleman, the son of Albert Grey, 4th Earl Grey.

Grey was born in London in 1879 and was the son of the 4th Earl of Grey. He attended Eton College, Windsor and graduated with a BA from Trinity College, Cambridge in 1901. At Cambridge he was a member of the University Pitt Club.

Career 
He stood as the Liberal Unionist candidate for Bradford Central.

As Viscount Howick, he served in the British Army, joining the Northumberland Imperial Yeomanry as a Second lieutenant while still at the university. In January 1902 he was appointed a second-lieutenant in the 1st Life Guards. and by 1915 was General Staff Officer 3rd class. He later gained the rank of Major. After service in the Great War Earl Grey was later granted Honorary Colonel of the Northumberland Volunteer Regiment and Nortumberland Fusiliers.
Charles Grey was also assistant secretary to Governor-General of South Africa

Grey was married on 16 June 1906 to Lady Mabel Laura Georgiana Palmer, later CBE (1919), the only daughter of William Palmer, 2nd Earl of Selborne. They had two daughters:

 Lady Mary Cecil Grey (1907–2002); married Evelyn Baring, 1st Baron Howick of Glendale and had issue
 Lady Elizabeth Katherine Grey (1908–1941); married Lt-Col Ronald Dawnay (brother of David Dawnay and grandson of Hugh Dawnay, 8th Viscount Downe) and had issue
 
5th Earl Grey died in Howick, near Alnwick, Northumberland, in 1963.

He was succeeded by his second cousin twice removed Richard Grey, 6th Earl Grey.

See also 
 Earl Grey

References

External links

Alumni of Trinity College, Cambridge
British Army personnel of World War I
Deputy Lieutenants of Northumberland
Earls Grey
People educated at Eton College
1879 births
1963 deaths
Liberal Unionist Party parliamentary candidates